Public administration (a form of governance) or public policy and administration (an academic discipline) is the implementation of public policy, administration of government establishment (public governance), management of non-profit establishment (nonprofit governance), and also a subfield of political science taught in public policy schools that studies this implementation and prepares civil servants, especially those in administrative positions for working in the public sector, voluntary sector, some industries in the private sector dealing with government relations and regulatory affairs, and those working as think tank researchers. As a "field of inquiry with a diverse scope" whose fundamental goal is to "advance management and policies so that government can function." Some of the various definitions which have been offered for the term are: "the management of public programs"; the "translation of politics into the reality that citizens see every day"; and "the study of government decision making, the analysis of the policies themselves, the various inputs that have produced them, and the inputs necessary to produce alternative policies." The word public administration is the combination of two words—public and administration. In every sphere of social, economic and political life there is administration which means that for the proper functioning of the organization or institution it must be properly ruled or managed and from this concept emerges the idea of administration.

In the United States in the 1880s, civil servants and academics like Woodrow Wilson worked to reform the civil service system and bring public administration into the realm of science[6]. However, "until the mid-twentieth century, when German sociologist Max Weber's theory of bureaucracy prevailed," he said, "there was no great interest in the theory of public administration. The field is multidisciplinary in character, and one of the various proposals for sub-fields of public administration sets out six pillars, including human resources, organizational theory, policy analysis, statistics, budgeting, and ethics.
Public administration is a segment of the larger field of administration. It is simply regarded as bureaucracy, heedless to the fact that bureaucracy as a particular organizational form is not only found in the government, but also in private and third sector organizations.(Dhameja,2003, p. 2). Public Administration is a discipline which is concerned with the organization and the formulation and implementation of public policies for the welfare of the people. It functions in a political setting in order to accomplish the goals and objectives, which are formulated by the political decision makers. The focus of public administration, thus, is on public bureaucracy. The subject got its major boost after the Minnowbrook conference held at Syracuse university in the year 1968, presided over by Dwight Waldo. It was this time when the concept of New Public Administration emerged.

Thus, public administration as a course of government action in relation to public policy as an outline of what government wants to do plays an important role in our society. It can be understood as the course of action or inaction by the government with regard to a particular issue or set of issues. It can be associated with formally approved policy goals and means, as well as the regulations and practices of agencies that implement the programs.The relationship between what the government (public administration) wants to accomplish and what actually occurs is carried by public policy. Therefore, the ultimate goal of all public policies is to achieve particular objectives that the government has in mind. The nation's citizens' welfare is a major consideration in the formulation and implementation of these programs. Because of this, the public's opinion, for one, exerts considerable pressure on the course of government (public administration) policies.

Definitions

Public administration refers to the management and implementation of public policies and programs by government agencies and officials at various levels of government, including national, state, and local levels. The primary goal of public administration is to ensure the efficient and effective delivery of public services to citizens and to promote the public good.

Public administration involves a range of activities, including budgeting, personnel management, policy analysis, program evaluation, and implementation of regulations and laws. Public administrators work in a variety of areas, including healthcare, education, transportation, housing, environmental protection, and social welfare.

The field of public administration is interdisciplinary, drawing on knowledge and methods from fields such as political science, economics, sociology, law, and management. Public administrators may work in government agencies, non-profit organizations, or in the private sector, and their roles may include policy analysts, program managers, budget analysts, and executive directors.

In 1947 Paul H. Appleby defined public administration as the "public leadership of public affairs directly responsible for executive action". In a democracy, it has to do with such leadership and executive action in terms that respect and contribute to the dignity, the worth, and the potentials of the citizen. One year later, Gordon Clapp, then Chairman of the Tennessee Valley Authority defined public administration "as a public instrument whereby democratic society may be more completely realized." This implies that it must "relate itself to concepts of justice, liberty, and fuller economic opportunity for human beings" and is thus "concerned with "people, with ideas, and with things". According to James D. Carroll & Alfred M. Zuck, the publication by "Woodrow Wilson of his essay, "The Study of Administration" in 1887 is generally regarded as the beginning of public administration as a specific field of study".

Drawing on the democracy theme and discarding the link to the executive branch, Patricia M. Shields asserts that public administration "deals with the stewardship and implementation of the products of a living democracy".  The key term "product" refers to "those items that are constructed or produced" such as prisons, roads, laws, schools, and security. "As implementors, public managers engage these products." They participate in the doing and making of the "living" democracy. A living democracy is "an environment that is changing, organic", imperfect, inconsistent and teaming with values. "Stewardship is emphasized because public administration is concerned "with accountability and effective use of scarce resources and ultimately making the connection between the doing, the making and democratic values".

More recently scholars claim that "public administration has no generally accepted definition", because the "scope of the subject is so great and so debatable that it is easier to explain than define". Public administration is a field of study (i.e., a discipline) and an occupation. There is much disagreement about whether the study of public administration can properly be called a discipline, largely because of the debate over whether public administration is a sub-field of political science or a sub-field of administrative science", the latter an outgrowth of its roots in policy analysis and evaluation research. Scholar Donald Kettl is among those who view public administration "as a sub-field within political science". According to Lalor a society with a public authority that provides at least one public good can be said to have a public administration whereas the absence of either (or a fortiori both) a public authority or the provision of at least one public good implies the absence of a public administration. He argues that public administration is the public provision of public goods in which the demand function is satisfied more or less effectively by politics, whose primary tool is rhetoric, providing for public goods, and the supply function is satisfied more or less efficiently by public management, whose primary tools are speech acts, producing public goods.  The moral purpose of public administration, implicit in its acceptance of its role, is the maximization of the opportunities of the public to satisfy its wants.

The North American Industry Classification System definition of the Public Administration (NAICS 91) sector states that public administration "... comprises establishments primarily engaged in activities of a governmental nature, that is, the enactment and judicial interpretation of laws and their pursuant regulations, and the administration of programs based on them". This includes "Legislative activities, taxation, national defense, public order and safety, immigration services, foreign affairs and international assistance, and the administration of government programs are activities that are purely governmental in nature".

From the academic perspective, the National Center for Education Statistics (NCES) in the United States defines the study of public administration as "A program that prepares individuals to serve as managers in the executive arm of local, state, and federal government and that focuses on the systematic study of executive organization and management. Includes instruction in the roles, development, and principles of public administration; the management of public policy; executive-legislative relations; public budgetary processes and financial management; administrative law; public personnel management; professional ethics; and research methods."

History

India in the 600 BCE

Such neat and prosperous civilisations as Harappa and Mohenjo-daaro must have had a disciplined, benevolent and uncorrupt cadre of public servants. In support of this, there are many references to Brihaspati's works on laws and governance. An interesting extract from Aaine-Akbari [vol.III, tr. by H. S. Barrett, pp217–218] written by Abul Fazl, the famous historian of Akbar's court, mentions a symposium of philosophers of all faiths held in 1578 at Akbar's instance. This sounds credible in the context of Akbar's restless desire to find truth, reflected in his launching a new religion called Din-e-elaahi. The account under advisement is given by the well-known historian Vincent Smith, in his article titled "The Jain Teachers of Akbar". Some Charvaka thinkers are said to have participated in the symposium. Under the heading "Naastika" Abul Fazl has referred to the good work, judicious administration and welfare schemes that were emphasised by the Charvaka law-makers. Somadeva has also mentioned the Charvaka method of defeating the enemies of the nation. He has referred to thirteen enemies who remain disguised in the kingdom for their selfish interests. They may contain a few relatives of the king and subsidiary rulers, but they should not be spared. They should be rigorously punished like any other such opponent. Kautilya, as already mentioned, has given a detailed scheme to remove the enemies in the garb of friends. The Charvaka stalwart, Brihaspati, is so much more ancient than Kautilya and Somadeva. He appears to be contemporaneous with the Harappa and Mohenjo-daaro culture.

The central point of traditional religious ritual is to earn ready money for its perpetrators. All unproductive, barren rites designed for various moments in human life starting from several months prior to birth and extending over several years beyond death in the form of the annual sraddha, many of which are current even today, are but channels to feed the priests. They are unreal, imagined and wasteful. While they are unreal, imagined and wasteful; the feeding is real.

This cunning paradox was realised by the Charvaka for its real worth. They wanted financial causes to produce financial results. Imagined causes only produced imagined results not real ones.

Antiquity to the 19th century
Dating back to Antiquity, Pharaohs, kings and emperors have required pages, treasurers, and tax collectors to administer the practical business of government. Prior to the 19th century, staffing of most public administrations was rife with nepotism, favouritism, and political patronage, which was often referred to as a "spoils system". Public administrators have long been the "eyes and ears" of rulers. In medieval times, the abilities to read and write, add and subtract were as dominated by the educated elite as public employment. Consequently, the need for expert civil servants whose ability to read and write formed the basis for developing expertise in such necessary activities as legal record-keeping, paying and feeding armies and levying taxes.  As the European Imperialist age progressed and the militarily powers extended their hold over other continents and people, the need for a sophisticated public administration grew.

The field of management may well be said to have originated in ancient China, including possibly the first highly centralized bureaucratic state, and the earliest (by the second century BC) example of an administration based on merit through testing. Far in advance of the rest of the world until almost the end of the 18th century, Sinologist Herrlee G. Creel and other scholars find the influence of Chinese administration in Europe by the 12th century, for example, in Fredrick II's promulgations, characterized as the "birth certificate of modern bureaucracy".  Thomas Taylor Meadows, Britain's consul in Guangzhou, argued in his Desultory Notes on the Government and People of China (1847) that "the long duration of the Chinese empire is solely and altogether owing to the good government which consists in the advancement of men of talent and merit only," and that the British must reform their civil service by making the institution meritocratic. Influenced by the ancient Chinese imperial examination, the Northcote–Trevelyan Report of 1854 recommended that recruitment should be on the basis of merit determined through competitive examination, candidates should have a solid general education to enable inter-departmental transfers, and promotion should be through achievement rather than "preferment, patronage, or purchase". This led to implementation of Her Majesty's Civil Service as a systematic, meritocratic civil service bureaucracy. Like the British, the development of French bureaucracy was influenced by the Chinese system.  Voltaire claimed that the Chinese had "perfected moral science" and François Quesnay advocated an economic and political system modeled after that of the Chinese. French civil service examinations adopted in the late 19th century were also heavily based on general cultural studies. These features have been likened to the earlier Chinese model.

Though Chinese administration cannot be traced to any one individual, emphasizing a merit system figures of the Fa-Jia like 4th century BC reformer Shen Buhai (400–337 BC) may have had more influence than any other, and might be considered its founder, if not valuable as a rare pre-modern example of abstract theory of administration. Creel writes that, in Shen Buhai, there are the "seeds of the civil service examination", and that, if one wishes to exaggerate, it would "no doubt be possible to translate Shen Buhai's term Shu, or technique, as 'science'", and argue that he was the first political scientist, though Creel does "not care to go this far".

The eighteenth-century noble, King Frederick William I of Prussia, created professorates in Cameralism in an effort to train a new class of public administrators. The universities of Frankfurt an der Oder and University of Halle were Prussian institutions emphasizing economic and social disciplines, with the goal of societal reform. Johann Heinrich Gottlob Justi was the most well-known professor of Cameralism. Thus, from a Western European perspective, Classic, Medieval, and Enlightenment-era scholars formed the foundation of the discipline that has come to be called public administration.

Lorenz von Stein, an 1855 German professor from Vienna, is considered the founder of the science of public administration in many parts of the world. In the time of Von Stein, public administration was considered a form of administrative law, but Von Stein believed this concept too restrictive. Von Stein taught that public administration relies on many preestablished disciplines such as sociology, political science, administrative law and public finance. He called public administration an integrating science, and stated that public administrators should be concerned with both theory and practice. He argued that public administration is a science because knowledge is generated and evaluated according to the scientific method.

Modern American public administration is an extension of democratic governance, justified by classic and liberal philosophers of the western world ranging from Aristotle to John Locke to Thomas Jefferson.

US History 1880s to 1940s

In the United States of America, Woodrow Wilson is considered the father of public administration. He first formally recognized public administration in an 1887 article entitled "The Study of Administration". The future president wrote that "it is the object of administrative study to discover, first, what government can properly and successfully do, and, secondly, how it can do these proper things with the utmost possible efficiency and at the least possible cost either of money or of energy". Wilson was more influential to the science of public administration than Von Stein, primarily due to an article Wilson wrote in 1887 in which he advocated four concepts:

 Separation of politics and administration
 Comparative analysis of political and private organizations
 Improving efficiency with business-like practices and attitudes toward daily operations
 Improving the effectiveness of public service through management and by training civil servants, merit-based assessment

The separation of politics and administration has been the subject of lasting debate.  The different perspectives regarding this dichotomy contribute to differentiating characteristics of the suggested generations of public administration.

By the 1920s, scholars of public administration had responded to Wilson's solicitation and thus textbooks in this field were introduced. A few distinguished scholars of that period were, Luther Gulick, Lyndall Urwick, Henri Fayol, Frederick Taylor, and others. Frederick Taylor (1856–1915), another prominent scholar in the field of administration and management also published a book entitled The Principles of Scientific Management (1911). He believed that scientific analysis would lead to the discovery of the "one best way" to do things or carrying out an operation. This, according to him could help save cost and time. Taylor's technique was later introduced to private industrialists, and later into the various government organizations (Jeong, 2007).

Taylor's approach is often referred to as Taylor's Principles or Taylorism. Taylor's scientific management consisted of main four principles (Frederick W. Taylor, 1911):
 Replace rule-of-thumb work methods with methods based on a scientific study of the tasks.
 Scientifically select, train, and develop each employee rather than passively leaving them to train themselves.
 Provide "detailed instruction and supervision of each worker in the performance of that worker's discrete task" (Montgomery 1997: 250).
 Divide work nearly equally between managers and workers, so that the managers apply scientific management principles to planning the work and the workers actually perform the tasks.

Taylor had very precise ideas about how to introduce his system (approach): "It is only through enforced standardization of methods, enforced adoption of the best implements and working conditions, and enforced cooperation that this faster work can be assured. And the duty of enforcing the adoption of standards and enforcing this cooperation rests with management alone."

The American Society for Public Administration (ASPA) the leading professional group for public administration was founded in 1939. ASPA sponsors the journal Public Administration Review, which was founded in 1940.

Retrieving the Lost Contribution of Women to the Founding of PA in the US
Contemporary scholars  are reclaiming a companion public administration origin story which includes the contributions of women. This has become known as the “alternative” or “Settlement” model of public administration. During the 19th century upper-class women in the United States and Europe organized voluntary associations that worked to mitigate the excesses of urbanization and industrialization that plagued their towns and cities. Eventually, these voluntary associations became networks that were able to spearhead changes to policy and administration.  These women's civic clubs worked to make cities and work spaces safer (cleaner streets, water and sewage, workplace regulation) and more suited to the needs of their children (playgrounds, libraries, juvenile courts, child labor laws). These were administrative and policy spaces ignored by their fathers and husbands. The work of these clubs was amplified by newly organized non-profit organizations (Settlement Houses), usually situated in industrialized city slums filled with immigrants.

The Settlement movement and its leaders such as Jane Addams, Julia Lathrop, and Florence Kelley  were instrumental in crafting the alternative, feminine inspired, model of public administration. This settlement model of public administration, had two interrelated components - municipal housekeeping and industrial citizenship. Municipal housekeeping called for cities to be run like a caring home.  The city, should be conceived as an extension of the home where families could be safe and children cared for.  Clean streets, clean water, playgrounds, educational curricular reform, and juvenile courts, are examples of reforms associated with this movement. Industrial citizenship focused on the problems and risks of labor force participation in a laissez faire, newly industrialized economy. Reforms which mitigated workplace problems such as child labor, unsanitary workplaces, excessive work schedules, risks of industrial accidents, and old age poverty were the focus of these efforts. Organized settlement women's reform efforts led to workplace safety laws and inspections. Settlement reformers went on to serve as local, state and federal administrators. Jane Addams was a garbage inspector, Florence Kelley served as the chief factory inspector for the State of Illinois, Julia Lathrop was the first director of the Women's Bureau and Francis Perkins was Secretary of Labor during the F. Roosevelt Administration

Reforms that emerged from the New Deal (e.g., income for the old, unemployment insurance, aid for dependent children and the disabled, child labor prohibitions and limits on hours worked etc.) were supported by leaders of the Settlement movement. Richard Stillman  credits Jane Addams, a key leader of the Settlement movement and a pioneer of public administration with “conceiving and spawning” the modern welfare state. The accomplishments of the Settlement movement and their conception of public administration was ignored in the early literature of public administration. The alternative model of Public Administration was invisible or buried for about 100 years until Camilla Stivers published Bureau Men and Settlement Women in 2000.

Settlement workers explicitly fought for social justice as they campaigned for reform. They sought policy changes that would improve the lives of immigrants, women, children, sick, old and impoverished people.   Both municipal housekeeping and industrial citizenship applied a pragmatic, ethic of care informed by feminine experience to policy and administration. While they saw the relevance of the traditional public administration values (efficiency, effectiveness, etc.) and practices of their male reformist counterparts, they also emphasized social justice and social equity. Jane Addams, for example, was a founder of the National Association for the Advancement of Colored people (NAACP).

US in the 1940s

The separation of politics and administration advocated by Wilson continues to play a significant role in public administration today. However, the dominance of this dichotomy was challenged by second generation scholars, beginning in the 1940s. Luther Gulick's fact-value dichotomy was a key contender for Wilson's proposed politics-administration dichotomy. In place of Wilson's first generation split, Gulick advocated a "seamless web of discretion and interaction".

Luther Gulick and Lyndall Urwick are two second-generation scholars. Gulick, Urwick, and the new generation of administrators built on the work of contemporary behavioural, administrative, and organizational scholars including Henri Fayol, Fredrick Winslow Taylor, Paul Appleby, Frank Goodnow, and Willam Willoughby. The new generation of organizational theories no longer relied upon logical assumptions and generalizations about human nature like classical and enlightened theorists.

Gulick developed a comprehensive, generic theory of organization that emphasized the scientific method, efficiency, professionalism, structural reform, and executive control. Gulick summarized the duties of administrators with an acronym; POSDCORB, which stands for planning, organizing, staffing, directing, coordinating, reporting, and budgeting. Fayol developed a systematic, 14-point treatment of private management. Second-generation theorists drew upon private management practices for administrative sciences. A single, generic management theory bleeding the borders between the private and the public sector was thought to be possible. With the general theory, the administrative theory could be focused on governmental organizations. The mid-1940s theorists challenged Wilson and Gulick. The politics-administration dichotomy remained the centre of criticism.

1950s to the 1970s
During the 1950s, the United States experienced prolonged prosperity and solidified its place as a world leader. Public Administration experienced a kind of heyday due to the successful war effort and successful post war reconstruction in Western Europe and Japan. Government was popular as was President Eisenhower. In the 1960s and 1970s, government itself came under fire as ineffective, inefficient, and largely a wasted effort.  The costly American intervention in Vietnam along with domestic scandals including the bugging of Democratic party headquarters (the 1974 Watergate scandal) are two examples of self-destructive government behaviour that alienated citizens.

There was a call by citizens for efficient administration to replace ineffective, wasteful bureaucracy. Public administration would have to distance itself from politics to answer this call and remain effective. Elected officials supported these reforms.  The Hoover Commission, chaired by University of Chicago professor Louis Brownlow, to examine reorganization of government. Brownlow subsequently founded the Public Administration Service (PAS) at the university, an organization which has provided consulting services to all levels of government until the 1970s.

Concurrently, after World War II, the whole concept of public administration expanded to include policymaking and analysis, thus the study of "administrative policy making and analysis" was introduced and enhanced into the government decision-making bodies. Later on, the human factor became a predominant concern and emphasis in the study of public administration. This period witnessed the development and inclusion of other social sciences knowledge, predominantly, psychology, anthropology, and sociology, into the study of public administration (Jeong, 2007). Henceforth, the emergence of scholars such as, Fritz Morstein Marx with his book The Elements of Public Administration (1946), Paul H. Appleby Policy and Administration (1952), Frank Marini 'Towards a New Public Administration' (1971), and others that have contributed positively in these endeavors.

Stimulated by events during the 1960s such as an active civil rights movement, the Vietnam war and war protests, assassinations of a president and civil rights leaders, and an active women's movement, public administration changed course somewhat. Landmark legislation such as the Equal Pay Act of 1963 and the Civil Rights Act of 1964 also gave public administrators new responsibilities. These events were manifest in the public administration profession through the new public administration movement. “Under the stimulating patronage of Dwight Waldo, some of the best of the younger generation of scholars challenged the doctrine they had received”. These new scholars demanded a more policy-oriented public administrators that incorporated “four themes: relevance, values, equity and change”. All of these themes would encourage more participation among women and minorities. 
Stimulated by the events of the 60s, the 1970s brought significant change for the American Society for Public Administration. Racial and ethnicity minority and women members organized to seek greater participation. Eventually, the Conference on Minority Public Administrators and the Section for Women in Public Administration were established.

1980s–1990s
In the late 1980s, yet another generation of public administration theorists began to displace the last.  The new theory, which came to be called New Public Management, was proposed by David Osborne and Ted Gaebler in their book Reinventing Government. The new model advocated the use of private sector-style models, organizational ideas and values to improve the efficiency and service-orientation of the public sector. During the Clinton Administration (1993–2001), Vice President Al Gore adopted and reformed federal agencies using NPM approaches. In the 1990s, new public management became prevalent throughout the bureaucracies of the US, the UK and, to a lesser extent, in Canada. The original public management theories have roots attributed to policy analysis, according to Richard Elmore in his 1986 article published in the "Journal of Policy Analysis and Management".

Some modern authors define NPM as a combination of splitting large bureaucracies into smaller, more fragmented agencies, encouraging competition between different public agencies, and encouraging competition between public agencies and private firms and using economic incentives lines (e.g., performance pay for senior executives or user-pay models). NPM treats individuals as "customers" or "clients" (in the private sector sense), rather than as citizens.

Some critics argue that the New Public Management concept of treating people as "customers" rather than "citizens" is an inappropriate borrowing from the private sector model, because businesses see customers as a means to an end (profit), rather than as the proprietors of government (the owners), opposed to merely the customers of a business (the patrons). In New Public Management, people are viewed as economic units not democratic participants which is the hazard of linking an MBA (business administration, economic and employer-based model) too closely with the public administration (governmental, public good) sector. Nevertheless, the NPM model (one of four described by Elmore in 1986, including the "generic model") is still widely accepted at multiple levels of government (e.g., municipal, state/province, and federal) and in many OECD nations.

In the late 1990s, Janet and Robert Denhardt proposed a new public services model in response to the dominance of NPM. A successor to NPM is digital era governance, focusing on themes of reintegrating government responsibilities, needs-based holism (executing duties in cursive ways), and digitalization (exploiting the transformational capabilities of modern IT and digital storage).

One example in the deployment of DEG is openforum.com.au, an Australian non-for-profit eDemocracy project which invites politicians, senior public servants, academics, business people and other key stakeholders to engage in high-level policy debate. Another example is Brunei's Information Department in deploying Social Media technology in improving its Digital Governance process. The book chapter work concludes that digital dividends can be secured through the effective application of Social Media within the framework of Digital Era Governance.

Another new public service model is what has been called New Public Governance, an approach which includes a centralization of power; an increased number, role and influence of partisan-political staff; personal-politicization of appointments to the senior public service; and, the assumption that the public service is promiscuously partisan for the government of the day.

In the mid-1980s, the goal of community programs in the United States was often represented by terms such as independent living, community integration, inclusion, community participation, deinstitutionalization, and civil rights. Thus, the same public policy (and public administration) was to apply to all citizens, inclusive of disability. However, by the 1990s, categorical state systems were strengthened in the United States (Racino, in press, 2014), and efforts were made to introduce more disability content into the public policy curricula with disability public policy (and administration) distinct fields in their own right. Behaviorists have also dominated "intervention practice" (generally not the province of public administration) in recent years, believing that they are in opposition to generic public policy (termed ecological systems theory, of the late Urie Bronfenbrenner).

Increasingly, public policy academics and practitioners have utilized the theoretical concepts of political economy to explain policy outcomes such as the success or failure of reform efforts or the persistence of suboptimal outcomes.

in the Philippines 
The Philippines was the first country to offer Public Administration (PA) degree programs in Asia beginning in 1952. PA programs were offered by the newly established Institute of Public Administration at the University of the Philippines (UP) in 1951, in line with the Bell Mission's recommendations to rebuild the civil service and facilitate recovery from World War 2. Since then, Philippine PA education has evolved with the changing political, administrative, and economic landscape. PA programs have expanded across the country, and PA professional and educational associations have grown.

Core branches
In academia, the field of public administration consists of a number of sub-fields. Scholars have proposed a number of different sets of sub-fields. One of the proposed models uses five "pillars":

Organizational theory in public administration is the study of the structure of governmental entities and the many particulars inculcated in them.
Ethics in public administration serves as a normative approach to decision making.
Policy analysis and program evaluation serves as an empirical approach to decision making.
Public budgeting is the activity within a government that seeks to allocate scarce resources among unlimited demands.
Human resource management is an in-house structure that ensures that public service staffing is done in an unbiased, ethical and values-based manner. The basic functions of the HR system are employee benefits, employee health care, compensation, and many more (e.g., human rights, Americans with Disabilities Act). The executives managing the HR director and other key departmental personnel are also part of the public administration system.

Decision-making models

Given the array of duties public administrators find themselves performing, the professional administrator might refer to a theoretical framework from which he or she might work.  Indeed, many public and private administrative scholars have devised and modified decision-making models.

Niskanen's budget-maximizing
In 1971, Professor William Niskanen proposed a rational choice variation which he called the "budget-maximizing model". He claimed that rational bureaucrats will universally seek to increase the budgets of their units (to enhance their stature), thereby contributing to state growth and increased public expenditure. Niskanen served on President Reagan's Council of Economic Advisors; his model underpinned what has been touted as curtailed public spending and increased privatization. However, budgeted expenditures and the growing deficit during the Reagan administration is evidence of a different reality.  A range of pluralist authors have critiqued Niskanen's universalist approach.  These scholars have argued that officials tend also to be motivated by considerations of the public interest.

Dunleavy's bureau-shaping
The bureau-shaping model, a modification of Niskanen, holds that rational bureaucrats only maximize the part of their budget that they spend on their own agency's operations or give to contractors and interest groups.  Groups that are able to organize a "flowback" of benefits to senior officials would, according to this theory, receive increased budgetary attention. For instance, rational officials will get no benefit from paying out larger welfare checks to millions of low-income citizens because this does not serve a bureaucrats' goals. Accordingly, one might instead expect a jurisdiction to seek budget increases for defense and security purposes in place programming. If we refer back to Reagan once again, Dunleavy's bureau shaping model accounts for the alleged decrease in the "size" of government while spending did not, in fact, decrease. Domestic entitlement programming was financially deemphasized for military research and personnel.

Academic field

Universities offer Undergraduate level Bachelor's degrees such as a Bachelor of Science (BS) or Bachelor of Arts (BA) in Public Administration or in Government, Political Science, and International Affairs with an academic concentration or specialization in Public Policy and Administration. Graduate school programs preparing students for advanced upper management careers in public administration typically offer the Master of Public Administration (MPA) degree, although at some universities, a Master of Arts (MA) or Master of Science (MS) in Public Administration is awarded for those taking the management tract, while those going for the research tract are offered the Master of Public Policy (MPP), a Master of Arts (MA),  or a Master of Science (MS) in Public Policy - some universities combine both management and research tracts into a Master of Public Policy and Administration (MPPA), even though both Public Administration and Public Policy degrees have considerable overlap in both academic content and career prospects barring some differing academic requirements based on desired sub-specialties in their future careers. Doctorate programs in Public Administration, Public Policy, and Political Science with a sub-specialization in Public Policy and Administration are also offered as terminal degrees for those who want to go into academia or teach as at institutions of higher education. These education programs are collectively called public policy degrees and are generally taught at public policy schools, while some are taught within a college of arts and sciences.

Most public policy and administration programs combine elements of political science, economics, statistics, law mostly in the form of public law, administrative law, and Legal management (academic discipline), international relations (including international law), international development, public finance, leadership studies, ethics, sociology, comparative research, global studies, urban planning, urban studies, public policy, and public administration. More recently, public policy schools have applied quantitative analysis, management information systems, data science and analytics, organizational behavior, organization development, knowledge management, project management, political communication, political psychology, criminology and the sociology of law, philosophy (in particular political philosophy), peace and conflict studies, geography and geographic information science, intelligence studies, emergency management, cross-cultural studies, public health, environmental science and environmental studies, business administration, civil engineering, industrial engineering, systems engineering, human resource management, and operations research as part of their public policy and public administration education programs to tackle issue in the public sector, the non-profit sector, or the government relations and regulatory affairs industry in the private sector.

While degrees in Public Policy and Public Administration at most universities are generally taught at the graduate level (master's and PhD), some undergraduate degree program majors, concentrations, and minors either as standalone degrees or as concentrations within a degree in political science or international relations still exist, especially at research universities where research, graduate, and undergraduate faculty overlap and/or have close cooperation within an autonomous public policy school unlike liberal arts colleges (particularly liberal arts colleges in the United States) that focus on the more theoretical and philosophical sides of political science at their college of arts and sciences rather than the applied and administrative side of political science.

In the United States, the academic field of public administration draws heavily on political science and administrative law. Some MPA programs (as well as undergraduate Public Administration-Political Science academic majors with an elective interdisciplinary concentration, academic minor, or program membership in Economics) include economics courses to give students a background in microeconomic issues (markets, rationing mechanisms, etc.) and macroeconomic issues (e.g., national debt). Scholars such as John A. Rohr write of a long history behind the constitutional legitimacy of government bureaucracy. In Europe (notably in Britain and Germany), the divergence of the field from other disciplines can be traced to the 1720s continental university curriculum. Formally, official academic distinctions were made in the 1910s and 1890s, respectively.

The goals of the field of public administration are related to the democratic values of improving equality, justice, security, efficiency and effectiveness of public services in a non-profit venue; business administration, on the other hand, is primarily concerned with expanding market share, generating revenue and earning profit. For a field built on concepts (accountability, governance, decentralization and clientele), these concepts are often ill-defined and typologies often ignore certain aspects of these concepts.

The more specific term "public management" refers to ordinary, routine or typical management that aims to achieve public good. In some definitions, "public management" refers to private sector, market-driven perspective on the operation of government. This typically involves putting senior executives on performance contracts, rather than tenured positions, instituting pay-for-performance systems for executives, creating revenue-generating agencies and so on.  This latter view is often called "new public management" (NPM) by its advocates.  New Public Management represents a reform attempt that emphasizes the professional nature of public administration. NPM advocates aim to replace the academic, moral or disciplinary emphasis of traditional public administration with a professional focus. Some theorists advocate a "bright line" differentiation of the professional field from related academic disciplines like political science and sociology; it remains interdisciplinary in nature.

One public administration scholar, Donald Kettl, argues that "public administration sits in a disciplinary backwater", because "for the last generation, scholars have sought to save or replace it with fields of study like implementation, public management, and formal bureaucratic theory". Kettl states that "public administration, as a subfield within political science... is struggling to define its role within the discipline". He notes two problems with public administration: it "has seemed methodologically to lag behind" and "the field's theoretical work too often seems not to define it"-indeed, "some of the most interesting recent ideas in public administration have come from outside the field".

Public administration theory is the domain in which discussions of the meaning and purpose of government, the role of bureaucracy in supporting democratic governments, budgets, governance, and public affairs takes place.  In recent years, public administration theory has periodically connoted a heavy orientation toward critical theory and postmodern philosophical notions of government, governance, and power.  However, many public administration scholars support a classic definition of the term emphasizing constitutionality, public service, bureaucratic forms of organization, and hierarchical government.

Comparative public administration
Comparative public administration or CPA is defined as the study of administrative systems in a comparative fashion or the study of public administration in other countries. There have been several issues which have hampered the development of comparative public administration, including: the major differences between Western countries and developing countries; the lack of curriculum on this sub-field in public administration programs; and the lack of success in developing theoretical models which can be scientifically tested. Even though CPA is a weakly formed field as a whole, this sub-field of public administration is an attempt at cross-cultural analysis, a "quest for patterns and regularities of administrative action and behavior." CPA is an integral part to the analysis of public administration techniques. The process of comparison allows for more widely applicable policies to be tested in a variety of situations.

Comparative public administration emerged during the post-World War II period in order to seek international developmental strategies which aided in the containment of communism during the Cold War. (Riggs 1954, Heady 1960) The developers of this field expanded on a general theory, a research agenda, and generalized "lessons learned". (Riggs 1954, Heady 1960) A prominent figure of Public Administration, Woodrow Wilson, commented on the study by saying, "Like principles of civil liberty are everywhere fostering like methods of government; and if comparative studies of the ways and means of government should enable us to offer suggestions which will practicably combine openness and vigor in the administration of such governments with ready docility to all serious, well-sustained public criticism, they will have approved themselves worthy to be ranked among the highest and most fruitful of the great departments of political study".  As the financial state of the powering countries began to stabilize toward the decline of the Cold War, the field of CPA began to diminish. The resulting decline caused the lack of further expansion of this study making it irrelevant.

Comparative public administration lacks curriculum, which has prevented it from becoming a major field of study. This lack of understanding of the basic concepts that build this field's foundation has ultimately led to its lack of use. For example, William Waugh, a professor at Georgia State University has stated "Comparative studies are difficult because of the necessity to provide enough information on the sociopolitical context of national administrative structures and processes for readers to understand why there are differences and similarities." He also asserts, "Although there is sizable literature on comparative public administration it is scattered and dated."

Waugh argues that public administration requires an understanding of different administrative structures and a comparison of different public administration models. The literature to build this base of knowledge is scattered and often hard to obtain. The lack or ill-formed use of comparative public administration has been detrimental for many countries, including the United States. Fred Riggs a political scientist, states that "comparisons to the United States also can be problematic, because of the tendency of many American scholars to presume the American organizational structures and processes are models for other nations to emulate, which was a failing of early developmental administrative studies." In this, he claims the misuse and misapplication of comparative public administration has led to it being underdeveloped.

The development and better use comparative public administration could lead to better understanding. In 2002, the National Security Strategy was used in the battle of hearts and minds. They tried to assimilate with an Arab and Islamic audience to push American values and democracy in an attempt to stop terrorism, when in fact the lack of comparison on the public level was ineffective and backfired. The lack of willingness to understand their culture led to more tension in the Middle East. In conclusion of these events there are not enough resources directed to the study of comparative public administration. For a basic understanding of sociopolitical structure of a society or culture is a key component of comparative public administration.

Despite all of its set backs there are examples of the application of well-formed Comparative Public Administration working in the world today. One of which is the comparison on the national level David Clark an author in this field states "In spite of similarities in public management reform rhetoric, it is argued that there is increasing divergence in the philosophy & practice of public service in the two nations, & and these differences reflect regimes that incorporate different ideals of citizenship." This highlights the benefit of proper comparison of public administration. By examining patterns that emerge in international public sectors one can identify similarities and differences in many things including ideals of citizenship on the local level. Although the United States failed use of Comparative Public Administration in the Middle East is noted, they did properly incorporate it domestically. "During the Clinton administration, the focus on residential energy consumption in the United States was elevated to a high level with the inauguration of the Million Solar Roofs initiative, in which the Department of Energy (DOE) sponsored workshops, developed a pool of existing federal lending and financing options, and worked with partners in the solar and building industries to remove market barriers to strengthen grassroots demand for solar technologies".

This grassroots demand may have come from the comparative knowledge that concluded "In the United States, residential and commercial buildings combined now use 71% of all electricity produced and account for 79% of all electricity expenditures. Annual CO2 emission attributed to electricity consumption in these U.S. buildings constitute 43% of the country's annual total CO2 emission, which is approximately equivalent to the total CO2 emission of Japan, France, and the United Kingdom combined. These levels support the claim of the Intergovernmental Panel on Climate Change that energy use in buildings offer more potential for reducing carbon emission than any other single sector in the United States and abroad.". This example compares CO2 emission in the United States to other countries and through the buildings sector; the US could cut down on  emission. The field of comparative public administration is often misunderstood for the definition itself is complex and requires layers of understanding. The field will require many more years of collaborative research before it becomes a widely recognized academic study.

Bachelor's degrees, academic concentrations, and academic minors 

Universities offer Undergraduate level Bachelor's degrees such as a Bachelor of Science (BS) and/or Bachelor of Arts (BA) in Public Administration or Government, Political Science, and International Affairs with a academic concentration or specialization in Public Policy and Administration. At a number of universities undergraduate level public administration and nonprofit management education is packaged together (along with international relations and security studies) in a degree in political science.

Master's degrees

Some public administration programs have similarities to business administration programs, in cases where the students from both the Master's in Public Administration (MPA) and Master's in Business Administration (MBA) programs take many of the same courses. In some programs, the MPA (or MAPA) is more clearly distinct from the MBA, in that the MPA often emphasizes substantially different ethical and sociological criteria that pertain to administering government programs for the public good that have not been key criteria for business managers, who typically aim to maximize profit or share price.
The MPA is related to similar graduate-level government studies programs including Master of Arts (MA) programs in public affairs, public policy, and political science.  MPA degrees may be more likely to include program emphases on policy analysis techniques or other topical focuses such as the study of international affairs as opposed to MA degrees, which tend to focus on constitutional issues such as separation of powers, administrative law, contracting with government, problems of governance and power, and participatory democracy. Some MPA degrees may be more oriented towards training students to undertake public service work tasks, whereas some MA programs may have a more academic, theoretical focus. Some universities offer their Masters in public administration as an MA degree (e.g., Carleton University in Ottawa, Canada and the University of Kerala in India).

Some universities offer mid-career Master's programs, sometimes called an MC/MPA, that can be taken part-time (often outside of business hours) by public servants and public service managers who are working full-time. Community programs may offer internships or continuing education credits. One example is the Maxwell School's mid-career Masters at Syracuse University, which was launched by Robert Iversen in the 1970s.

Doctoral degrees

There are two types of doctoral degrees in public administration: the Doctor of Public Administration (DPA) and the Ph.D. in public administration. The DPA is an applied-research doctoral degree in the field of public administration, focusing on the practice of public administration more than on its theoretical aspects. The DPA requires coursework beyond the Masters level and a thesis, dissertation or other doctoral project. Upon successful completion of the doctoral requirements, the title of "Doctor" is awarded and the post-nominals of D.P.A. can be used. Some universities use the Ph.D. as their doctoral degree in public administration (e.g., Carleton University in Ottawa, Canada, and the University Of Kerala in India). The Ph.D. is typically sought by individuals aiming to become professors of public administration or researchers. Individuals pursuing a Ph.D. in public administration often pursue more theoretical dissertation topics than their DPA counterparts.

Notable scholars

Notable scholars of public administration have come from a range of fields. In the period before public administration existed as its own independent discipline, scholars contributing to the field came from economics, sociology, management, political science, administrative law, and, other related fields. More recently, scholars from public administration and public policy have contributed important studies and theories.

Notable Institutions 

 O'Neill School of Public and Environmental Affairs at Indiana University
 University of Georgia School of Public and International Affairs
 Leiden University
 Blavatnik School of Government 
 Erasmus University Rotterdam
 Hertie School in Berlin
 Harvard Kennedy School of Government
 London School of Economics
 Munk School of Global Affairs and Public Policy 
 Paul H. Nitze School of Advanced International Studies 
 Sciences Po Paris
 University of Warwick

Career prospects 
Public administration is "centrally concerned with the organization of government policies and programs as well as the behavior of officials (usually non-elected) formally responsible for their conduct". Many non-elected public employees such as political appointees and civil servants are considered public administrators. This includes political appointees, upper management-level civil servants (senior executive service), and lower-level civil servants such as heads of city, county, regional, state and federal departments such as municipal budget directors, human resources (HR) administrators, city managers, census managers, state mental health directors, cabinet members (cabinet secretaries in presidential systems), paralegals, lawyers, legislative assistants, office secretaries, project managers, and many more non-elected positions in government. Public administrators are public employees working in public departments and agencies, at all levels of government. Most industries in the private sector dealing with government relations and regulatory affairs, as well as nonprofit organizations in the voluntary sector also hire those with public administration and political science degrees.

International organizations
There are a number of international public administration organizations. The Commonwealth Association of Public Administration and Management (CAPAM) is diverse, as it includes the 54 member states of the Commonwealth from India and the UK to Nauru. Its biennial conference brings together ministers of public service, top public officials and leading scholars. The oldest organization is the International Institute of Administrative Sciences (IIAS). Based in Brussels, Belgium, the IIAS is a worldwide platform providing a space for exchanges that promote knowledge and good practices to improve the organization and operation of public administration. The IIAS also aims to ensure that public agencies will be in a position to better respond to the current and future expectations and needs of society. The IIAS has set up four entities: the International Association of Schools and Institutes of Administration (IASIA), the European Group for Public Administration (EGPA), The Latin American Group for Public Administration (LAGPA) and the Asian Group for Public Administration (AGPA). IASIA is an association of organizations and individuals whose activities and interests focus on public administration and management. The activities of its members include education and training of administrators and managers. It is the only worldwide scholarly association in the field of public management. EGPA, LAGPA and AGPA are the regional sub-entities of the IIAS. Another body, the International Committee of the US-based Network of Schools of Public Policy, Affairs, and Administration (NASPAA), has developed a number of relationships around the world.  They include sub regional and National forums like CLAD, INPAE and NISPAcee, APSA, ASPA.

The Center for Latin American Administration for Development (CLAD), based in Caracas, Venezuela, this regional network of schools of public administration set up by the governments in Latin America is the oldest in the region. The institute is a founding member and played a central role in organizing the Inter-American Network of Public Administration Education (INPAE). Created in 2000, this regional network of schools is unique in that it is the only organization to be composed of institutions from North and Latin America and the Caribbean working in public administration and policy analysis. It has more than 49 members from top research schools in various countries throughout the hemisphere.

NISPAcee is a network of experts, scholars and practitioners who work in the field of public administration in central Europe and Eastern Europe, including the Russian Federation and the Caucasus and Central Asia. The US public administration and political science associations like NASPAA, American Political Science Association (APSA) and American Society of Public Administration (ASPA). These organizations have helped to create the fundamental establishment of modern public administration.

Eastern Regional Organization for Public Administration (EROPA) is a state-membership based organization, open to other organizations and individuals, headquartered in the Philippines with centres and membership organized around the Asia Pacific region. EROPA organizes annual conferences, and publishes a journal Asian Review of Public Administration (ARPA). It has a number of centres in the region, and assists in networking experts with its members.

Public management

"Public management" is an approach to government administration and non-profit administration that resembles or draws on private-sector management and business techniques and approaches. These business approaches often aim to maximize efficiency and effectiveness and provide improved customer service.  A contrast is drawn with the study of public administration, which emphasizes the social and cultural drivers of government that many contend (e.g., Graham T. Allison and Charles Goodsell) makes it different from the private sector. proposes a positive and negative definitions of public management. The positive approach as: "praxeological ana rightful process of public service for citizens for the sake of their and following generations good through strengthening mutual relationships, competitiveness of national economy and practical increase of social utility through effective allocation of public resorurces". Negative approach as: "Fiction, whose aim is the possibility of temporal or permanent appropriation of public goods for the implementation of the particular interests of a narrow social group". Studying and teaching about public management are widely practiced in developed nations.

Organizations
Many entities study public management in particular, in various countries, including:
In the US, the American Society for Public Administration. Indiana University Bloomington
In Canada, the Institute of Public Administration of Canada, the Observatoire de l'Administtation publique, and various projects of the Federation of Canadian Municipalities and Infrastructure Canada
In the UK, Newcastle Business School, Warwick Business School, the London School of Economics, University College London, the UK local democracy project and London Health Observatory.
In the Netherlands, Erasmus University Rotterdam
In Australia, the Institute of Public Administration Australia.
 In Belgium, the Public Governance Institute, KU Leuven.
In Germany, the German University of Administrative Sciences Speyer, the Hertie School of Governance, the Bachelor and Master of Politics, Administration & International Relations (PAIR) at the Zeppelin University Friedrichshafen, and the Bachelor and Master of Public Policy & Management and the Executive Public Management Master of University of Potsdam.
In Switzerland, the University of Geneva and the Swiss Graduate School of Public Administration (IDHEAP).
In Italy, the SDA Bocconi School of Management, the graduate business school of Bocconi University in Milan, Italy.
In Cyprus, the Cyprus International Institute of Management or CIIM.
In Ireland, the Institute of Public Administration, Dublin.
In South Africa, Regenesys Business School through the Regenesys School of Public Management and MANCOSA.

Comparative public management, through government performance auditing, examines the efficiency and effectiveness of two or more governments.

See also

Administration (government)
Administrative discretion
Administrative law
Budgeting
Bureaucracy
Civil society
 Community services
Max Weber
Doctor of Public Administration
List of Public Administration Journals
List of public administration schools
Master of Public Administration
Municipal government
Official
Politics
Professional administration
Public administration theory
Public policy
Policy Studies
Public policy schools
Teleadministration
Theories of administration
The Study of Administration

Societies

International Institute of Administrative Sciences
American Society for Public Administration
Chinese Public Administration Society
Dutch Association for Public Administration
Indian Institute of Public Administration
Joint University Council of the Applied Social Sciences
Korea Institute of Public Administration
Royal Institute of Public Administration

Public management academic resources
 Public Policy and Administration, (electronic)  (print), SAGE Publications and Joint University Council of the Applied Social Sciences
 International Journal of Public Sector Management, Emerald Group Publishing
 Public Management Review,  (electronic)  (paper) Routledge
 Public Works Management & Policy,  (electronic)  (paper), SAGE Publications

Notes

References

Further reading
 Dubois, H.F.W. & Fattore, G. (2009), 'Definitions and typologies in public administration research: the case of decentralization', International Journal of Public Administration, 32(8): 704–27.
 Jeong Chun Hai @Ibrahim, & Nor Fadzlina Nawi. (2007). Principles of Public Administration: An Introduction. Kuala Lumpur: Karisma Publications. 
 Smith, Kevin B. and Licari, Michael J. (2006) Public Administration – Power and Politics in the Fourth Branch of Government, LA: Roxbury Pub. Co. 
 White, Jay D. and Guy B. Adams. Research in public administration: reflections on theory and practice. 1994.
 Donald Menzel and Harvey White (eds) 2011. The State of Public Administration: Issues, Challenges and Opportunity. New York: M. E. Sharpe.

Public management
Janicke, M. (1990). State Failure. Cambridge: Polity Press.
Kanter, R. M. (1985). The Change Masters: Corporate Entrepreneurs at Work. Hemel Hempstead: Unwin Paperbacks.
Lane, R. E. (1991). The Market Experience. New York: Cambridge University Press.
Lynn, L. E., Jr.  (1996). "Public Management as Art, Science, and Profession."  Chatham House, CQ Press.
Lynn, L. E., Jr.  (2006).  "Public Management: Old and New."  Routledge.
Raczkowski, K. (2016). "Public Management: Theory and Practice." Springer

External links

 Gov Monitor: A public administration, policy and public sector website
 Public Administration Theory Network (PAT-Net) : This is an international network of professionals concerned with the advancement of public administration theory.
 United Nations Public Administration Network (UNPAN): A body which aims to establish an Internet-based network that links regional and national institutions devoted to public administration.
National Association of Schools of Public Affairs and Administration
International Public Management Network
International Public Management Association for Human Resources
American Society for Public Administration

public-administration definition nature and dimension

 
Management education
Public policy
Subfields of political science